Donald Smith Gwinn (November 6, 1902 – June 3, 1961) was an American track and field athlete who competed in the 1928 Summer Olympics.

He was born in Woodsfield, Ohio.

In 1928 he finished fifth in the hammer throw event.

References
 
 Photo of Don Gwinn in 1926, PhillyHistory.org.

1902 births
1961 deaths
American male hammer throwers
Olympic track and field athletes of the United States
Athletes (track and field) at the 1928 Summer Olympics
People from Woodsfield, Ohio